Zak Smith (born July 16, 1976), also known as Zak Sabbath, is an American artist, role-playing game author, and adult actor.

Early life and education
Smith was born in Syracuse, New York and grew up in Washington, D.C. After receiving a BFA from Cooper Union in 1998, he studied at the Skowhegan School of Painting and Sculpture in Skowhegan, Maine and went on to receive an MFA from Yale University in 2001.

Career
Apart from his work as role-playing game author and artist Smith is also known as a hardcore porn actor.

Public collections containing Smith's art include the Museum of Modern Art, the Whitney Museum of American Art, the Walker Art Center and Saatchi Gallery. Some of his works are shown on Artsy. Zak Smith is represented by Fredericks & Freiser Gallery in New York City.

Personal life
Smith lived and worked in Brooklyn, New York until October 2007, when he moved to Los Angeles.  He was formerly in a long-term relationship with adult industry performer Mandy Morbid. Smith describes himself as an anarchist.

Sexual abuse allegations
Due to allegations of abuse by several women including Morbid, Wizards of the Coast announced in February 2019 they would be removing all references to Smith from the print and digital editions of Dungeons & Dragons fifth edition. Kenneth Hite, a former RPG collaborator, apologized to the women and said he would donate the proceeds from their upcoming book to a non-profit addressing domestic violence. OneBookShelf announced it would no longer work with Smith and would donate revenue generated from existing titles with Smith to the Rape, Abuse & Incest National Network. Smith was also banned from attending Gen Con. Smith denied the accusations and filed a defamation lawsuit against Morbid.

Bibliography

Art 
 Zak Smith: Pictures of Girls (New York: Distributed Art Publishers, 2005). 
 Pictures Showing What Happens on Each Page of Thomas Pynchon's Novel Gravity's Rainbow (graphic representation of novel/illustration) (Portland, Oregon: Tin House Books, 2006). 
 We Did Porn: Memoir and Drawings. (Portland, Oregon: Tin House Books, 2009). 
 The Worst Breakfast (illustrator, with writer China Miéville, Akashic Books, 2016).

RPGs 
 Vornheim: The Complete City Kit (Lamentations of the Flame Princess, 2011). 
 A Red & Pleasant Land (Lamentations of the Flame Princess, 2014). 
 Death Frost Doom (Lamentations of the Flame Princess, 2014). 
 Maze of the Blue Medusa (with Patrick Stuart, Satyr Press, 2016). 
 Frostbitten & Mutilated (Lamentations of the Flame Princess, 2018).

Awards

References

External links
 
 
 Zak Smith at rpggeek.com

1976 births
20th-century American painters
21st-century American painters
21st-century American male artists
Alt porn
American male painters
American male pornographic film actors
Artists from Syracuse, New York
Indie role-playing game designers
Living people
American erotic artists
20th-century American male artists
Cooper Union alumni
Yale University alumni
Skowhegan School of Painting and Sculpture alumni